Copa João Havelange Group Green and White was one of the three groups of 2000 season's first stage of the Campeonato Brasileiro Série A football league, named Copa João Havelange. It consists of 55 teams in 8 groups.

Teams

Group Green

First round

Group A

Group B

Group C

Group D

Group E

Group F

Group G

Group H

Second round

Group 1

Group 2

Group 3

Group 4

Group 5

Group 6

Third round

Group A

Group B

Final

References
RSSSF

Green And White
2000 in Brazilian football leagues